Zhu Lin (born 28 January 1994) is a Chinese professional tennis player. On 6 March 2023, Zhu reached a career-high singles ranking of world No. 33 and a doubles ranking of world No. 90. She has won the 2023 Thailand Open in singles and 2019 Jiangxi Open in doubles. She has also won one singles and one doubles title in WTA 125 tournaments, as well as 15 singles and six doubles titles on the ITF Circuit.

Playing for China Fed Cup team, Zhu has a win–loss record of 7–4.

Early life and background
Zhu Lin was born on 28 January 1994 to Zhu Jiangming and Chen Yunqi in Wuxi, China. Her father introduced her to tennis at age four. She has a very aggressive style of play, and her signature shot and also favorite shot is forehand. Her tennis idol growing up was Martina Hingis.

Junior career
Zhu debuted on the ITF Junior Circuit in September 2009 at the age of 15 at the China Junior 1 Open, where she also reached her first singles final. She lost that match against Turkish player Melis Sezer, in straight sets. The following week, she played at China Junior 2 Open, where she also had success, reaching the semifinals in both singles and doubles. She continued having success in her next tournament, where she won the title in singles and reached semifinals in doubles in the 2009 Widjojo Soejono Semen Gresik Junior Championships. The next week, Zhu won her first doubles title and also reached the semifinal in singles at the Solo Open International Junior Championships. Toward the end of the year, she reached one singles final at the PHINMA International Juniors (week 2), where she lost, but won two doubles titles, at that tournament.

In January 2010, Zhu debuted at a junior Grand Slam tournament, playing at the Australian Open, where she was stopped in the third round by Kristýna Plíšková. In April 2010, she reached the quarterfinals at the Dunlop Japan Open Junior Championships, in both singles and doubles. At the end of May 2010, she played at the Asian Closed Junior Tennis Championships in New Delhi, India. There she reached the semifinal in singles and the final in doubles. In September 2010, she lost in the first round of the Junior US Open, in singles. Toward the end of the year, she won China Junior 2 - Xiamen in singles.

In January 2011, she played at the Australian Open, where she lost in the second round, in both singles and doubles. It was her last junior doubles tournament. Her last junior singles tournament was at the China Junior 10 Dalian, where she lost in the third round. Her highest junior combined ranking was 39, that she reached on 17 January 2011.

Professional career

2009–13: Playing on the ITF Circuit
Zhu made her debut on the ITF Circuit in June 2009, at Qianshan, China, where she was stopped in the second round. In October 2010, she played her first ITF final, at Nonthaburi, Thailand, but lost in that final from Nungnadda Wannasuk. Later, on 24 October, she won her first ITF singles title, at Khon Kaen, Thailand. In November 2010, she won her first doubles title, at Manila, Phlippines. In 2011, Zhu won one ITF singles title, at Jakarta, Indonesia. In 2012, she reached only one final in singles, at Pattaya, Thailand which she lost. In 2013, she debuted at the WTA 125 tournaments, when she lost at the Suzhou Ladies Open in the first round in both category.

2014: Success at ITF events & WTA Tour debut
Zhu started the year in Antalya, Turkey, where she reached the final and lost to Lenka Wienerová. In March, she won a $10k event in Ankara defeating Iryna Shymanovich. In June, she won three consecutive tournaments: her first $25k level tournament in Belikpapan, Indonesia, then the $10k events in Tarakan and the following week in Solo, both Indonesia. She also reached her first significant final at the Xi'an Open, but lost to Duan Yingying. In August, she played her first Grand Slam qualifying; after defeating Giulia Gatto-Monticone and Arina Rodionova, she lost in the third round to Zheng Saisai. Zhu made her WTA Tour debut at the Hong Kong Open. Having entered the qualifying tournament, she defeated Wang Yafan, Raluca Olaru, and Elitsa Kostova for a spot in the main draw, where she subsequently recorded her first ever main-draw win on tour level by defeating Kristýna Plíšková in the first round, but was stopped in the second by Jana Čepelová. In September, Zhu played at the Premier-5 level Wuhan Open but failed to qualify. Next week, she played her first Premier Mandatory tournament, in the main draw of the China Open where she defeated Anastasia Pavlyuchenkova in the first round, but lost to Simona Halep in the second.

2015: Major debut

In January, Zhu failed to qualify for the Australian Open. At the Indian Wells Open, she reached the second round by defeating Francesca Schiavone, but then lost to Sara Errani. She failed to qualify for the Miami Open, Madrid Open and French Open. Zhu made her major singles debut at Wimbledon, where she lost to Belarusian qualifier Aliaksandra Sasnovich in three sets. At the US Open, she lost in the first round of qualifying.

2016: Success in doubles on the ITF Circuit
She won the title at the Launceston International, her first tournament in the year where she played doubles. In April at the $25k event in Kashiwa, Japan, she reached the final in doubles. In late July, she won the Lexington Challenger, partnering with Hiroko Kuwata. At the Wuhan Open, she failed to qualify in singles, but reached the second round in doubles together with Han Xinyun, they lost to Bethanie Mattek-Sands and Lucie Šafářová. At the China Open, she also failed to qualify in singles, and in doubles, she was eliminated in the first round. In November, she reached her first $100k final in doubles at the Shenzhen Open, but lost with Han Xinyun against You Xiaodi and Nina Stojanović.

2019–20: First major win & WTA doubles title, top 100 debut

At the Dubai Championships, Zhu made one of her biggest wins, defeating reigning Doha champion Elise Mertens, but lost in the second round to Lesia Tsurenko. On 25 February 2019, she entered the top 100 in singles, reaching world No. 93.

After losing six first-round matches, Zhu clinched her first singles victory at a Grand Slam tournament at the US Open, beating compatriot teenager Wang Xinyu in straight sets, before she lost to Madison Keys in the second round.

In September, she played her first WTA Tour final, at the 2019 Jiangxi International Open, where she and Wang Xinyu defeated Peng Shuai and Zhang Shuai in an all-Chinese final.

2021: First WTA Challenger singles title
In December, she won her first singles title on the WTA Challenger Tour in Seoul, defeating Kristina Mladenovic in the final.

2022: Guadalajara WTA 1000 and top 60 debuts
At the 2022 Guadalajara Open, she defeated Alize Cornet in the first round. She followed up this win, with a loss against Daria Kasatkina in the second round. Two weeks later, she reached her then career highest singles ranking of No. 58.

2023: Major 4th round, first top-10 win & WTA title, singles top 50 & doubles top 100
The start of the season was promising for Zhu. In the opening week, she reached the quarterfinal at the Auckland Open after defeating Venus Williams. Her journey continued at the Australian Open where she reached the fourth round of a Grand Slam for the first time in her career and also defeated two seeds on the way, 32nd seed Jil Teichmann and sixth seed Maria Sakkari, her first top-10 win. She lost a tight three-set match to Victoria Azarenka in the fourth round.

In Hua Hin, Thailand, she defeated seventh seed  Wang Xinyu in the semifinals with whom she reached the doubles final at the same tournament. She won her first WTA singles title defeating Ukrainian Lesia Tsurenko in the final. As a result, she reached new career-high rankings of No. 41 in singles and No. 90 in doubles, on 6 February 2023.

Performance timelines

Only main-draw results in WTA Tour, Grand Slam tournaments, Fed Cup/Billie Jean King Cup and Olympic Games are included in win–loss records.

Singles
Current after the 2023 Indian Wells Open.

Doubles
Current through the 2023 Thailand Open.

WTA career finals

Singles: 1 (1 title)

Doubles: 3 (1 title, 2 runner-ups)

WTA Challenger finals

Singles: 1 (title)

Doubles: 1 (title)

ITF Circuit finals

Singles: 27 (15 titles, 12 runner–ups)

Doubles: 10 (6 titles, 4 runner–ups)

Head-to-head record

Top 10 wins

Notes

References

External links

 
 
 

1994 births
Living people
Chinese female tennis players
Sportspeople from Wuxi
Tennis players from Jiangsu